MP3Concept is the first trojan horse for Mac OS X, created around April 2004. MP3Concept is benign, it was designed as a proof of concept regarding how a file can be disguised to an end user in a GUI environment on Mac OS X. It is an application bundle that looks like an MP3 file. When launched, it plays a clip of a man laughing. Since its creation Apple has added additional verifications to the Finder to prevent such an attack. Antivirus software also now looks for its characteristics as well.

External links
Symantec profile
DownloadCheck - a simple utility by The Iconfactory to verify files are files, not applications

2004 software
Trojan horses
MacOS-only software